Erik Baumann (October 30, 1889 – November 25, 1955) was a Swedish composer of the film scores. He spent a number of years working at the Sundbyberg Studios of Europa Film He was the brother of the film director Schamyl Bauman.

Selected filmography
 The Red Day (1931)
 The Southsiders (1932)
 Secret Svensson (1933)
 Fridolf in the Lion's Den (1933)
 Saturday Nights (1933)
 The Women Around Larsson (1934)
 Close Relations (1935)
 Our Boy (1936)
 South of the Highway (1936)
 The Quartet That Split Up (1936)
 Raggen (1936)
 Storm Over the Skerries (1938)
 Baldwin's Wedding (1938)
 Sun Over Sweden (1938)
 For Better, for Worse (1938)
 We at Solglantan (1939)
 Frestelse (1940)
 Hanna in Society (1940)
 Heroes in Yellow and Blue (1940)
 Lasse-Maja (1941)
 Adventurer (1942)
 We House Slaves (1942)
 A Girl for Me (1943)
 The People of Hemsö (1944)
 Skipper Jansson (1944)
 Widower Jarl (1945)
 Meeting in the Night (1946)
 One Swallow Does Not Make a Summer (1947)
 Each to His Own Way (1948)
 Number 17 (1949)
 Pimpernel Svensson (1950)
 Restaurant Intim (1950)

References

Bibliography
 Porter, Jack W. & Henrysson, Harald. A Jussi Bjoerling Discography. Jussi Bjoerling Memorial Archive, 1982.

External links

1889 births
1955 deaths
Swedish composers